Erik Lewerström (born May 28, 1980, in Grums, Sweden) is a professional Swedish ice hockey player.

He is currently playing for the Sparta Sarpsborg in the Norwegian GET-ligaen. He has played with Sparta since 2007. Before signing with Sparta he had played in Swedish Elite League for Färjestads BK and Malmö Redhawks. He has also represented Grums IK and Nybro IF in the Allsvenskan. In 2002 he won the Swedish Championship while playing for Färjestads BK.

He represented Sweden in the World Junior Hockey Championships in 2000.

External links 
 

1980 births
Arizona Coyotes draft picks
Färjestad BK players
Living people
Malmö Redhawks players
Sparta Warriors players
Swedish ice hockey defencemen